The 1958–59 FAW Welsh Cup is the 72nd season of the annual knockout tournament for competitive football teams in Wales.

Key
League name pointed after clubs name.
B&DL - Birmingham & District League
FL D2 - Football League Second Division
FL D3 - Football League Third Division
FL D4 - Football League Fourth Division
SFL - Southern Football League

Fifth round
Ten winners from the Fourth round and six new clubs.

Sixth round

Semifinal
Bangor City and Lovell's Athletic played at Wrexham, replay at Newtown; Cardiff City and Wrexham played at Shrewsbury.

Final
Final were held at Newport.

External links
The FAW Welsh Cup

1958-59
Wales
Cup